The Australian Centre for International Agricultural Research (ACIAR) is an Australian Government statutory agency in the Department of Foreign Affairs and Trade portfolio, reporting to the Minister of Foreign Affairs.

ACIAR forms part of the Australian Government's overseas aid program.

The ACIAR mandate is to amplify the impact of Australia’s outstanding capabilities in agricultural science by brokering and funding agricultural research for development partnerships in developing countries. The agency works with public and private research institutions to improve the productivity and sustainability of agricultural systems and the resilience of food systems in partner countries in the Indo-Pacific region.

ACIAR supports Australia’s national interests by contributing to sustainable economic growth, poverty reduction and enhanced regional stability, with a particular focus on economic diplomacy and women’s economic empowerment. ACIAR work aligns closely with Australia’s development assistance program, supporting research collaboration while emphasising human capacity building and private sector-led development, targeted at improved livelihoods in agriculture, forestry and fisheries.

The ACIAR research portfolio encompasses:

 key agriculture sectors—crops, fisheries, forestry, horticulture and livestock 
 science and disciplines supporting these sectors—agronomy, plant genetics, livestock production, agribusiness, social sciences, soil and land management, water, and climate
 assessment of achievements to guide future investment—impact evaluation.

ACIAR aims to contribute to poverty reduction and improved regional security, with a particular focus on Papua New Guinea and Pacific island countries, and in partner countries in East Asia, South and West Asia and Eastern and Southern Africa.

ACIAR builds the knowledge base that underpins six strategic development objectives:

 food security and poverty reduction 
 natural resources and climate change 
 human health and nutrition 
 gender equity and women’s empowerment 
 inclusive value chains 
 scientific and policy capacity building.

Around 65% of ACIAR research expenditure is implemented through bilateral arrangements between ACIAR and partner countries in the Indo-Pacific region.

ACIAR also manages Australia’s investment in the global agricultural research system, chief among which is the Consultative Group on International Agriculture Research Centres (CGIAR). ACIAR represents Australia on the CGIAR System Council, and Australians occupy a number of leadership positions across the CGIAR network.

To promote and support collaborative research initiatives that progress six strategic objectives, ACIAR also provides research support to other multilateral institutions, including:

 Pacific Community
 Asia-Pacific Association of Agricultural Research Institutions
 World Vegetable Center
 Global Research Alliance on Agricultural Greenhouse Gases
 CABI 

ACIAR develops and manages co-investment alliances and partnerships with like-minded organisations to foster and implement global research collaborations that support strategic development in agriculture, fisheries and forestry including the:

 International Development Research Centre (IDRC)
 Syngenta Foundation for Sustainable Agriculture
 Crawford Fund

ACIAR supports the following initiatives through global research collaborations:

 CultiAF
 Food Loss Research Program
 Demand-led breeding

The head office for ACIAR is located at ACIAR House in Canberra, Australia.

Chief executive officer 
Professor Andrew Campbell is the Chief Executive Officer of the Australian Centre for International Agricultural Research.

During his tenure, Professor Campbell has led the development of a 10-Year Strategy that focuses strongly on issues such as food security, gender equality, climate change, nutrition and health.

Professor Campbell has overseen the implementation of capacity building partnerships such as the Meryl Williams Fellowship, fostering opportunities for female agricultural scientists in developing countries. ACIAR has an alumni network of more than 600 scientists, many in leadership roles in partner countries.

During Professor Campbell's leadership his commitment to gender equality has seen the proportion of women in senior roles at ACIAR increase from 11 per cent in 2016 to 70 per cent in 2021.

Commission for International Agricultural Research 
The Commission for International Agricultural Research was established under Section 7 of the ACIAR Act 1982. Its functions are to provide advice to the Foreign Minister on the formulation of agricultural research programs and policies to identify agricultural problems and find solutions in developing countries.

The current commissioners are:

 Mrs Fiona Simson GAICD, BA (chair)
 Prof Andrew Campbell FTSE FAICD
 Dr Sasha Courville
 Emeritus Prof Lindsay Falvey FTSE, FAIAS
 Ms Su McCluskey FCPA
 Dr Beth Woods OAM FTSE
 Tony York

Policy Advisory Council (for International Agricultural Research) 
The Policy Advisory Council (the Council) was established under Section 17 of the ACIAR Act 1982. The Council provides advice to the Foreign Minister regarding agricultural problems of developing countries, and programs and policies for agricultural research that identify agricultural problems and/or find solutions to agricultural problems in developing countries.

The current board appointments are:

 Prof Ramesh Chan
 Dr Reynaldo Ebora
 Prof Achmad Suryana
 Prof Wendy Umberger
 Prof Teatulohi Matainaho
 Dr Audrey Aumua
 Dr Segenet Kelemu        
 Kathryn Campbell AO CSC
 Dr Nguyen Van Bo
 Dr Rachel Chikwamba
 Surmsuk Salakpetch
 Sunny Verghese

History of ACIAR 
In 1976 Sir John Crawford recommended the Australian Government set-up and fund an independent International Research Assistance Foundation in Australia  in a report tabled in the Australian Parliament.

At the Commonwealth Heads of Government meeting in 1981, the Australian Government announced it would establish an agricultural research centre charged with contracting research to Australian institutions in the field of agriculture and related disciplines for the benefit of developing countries.

On 3 June 1982, ACIAR formally came into being when the Australian Centre for International Agricultural Research Act 1982 (the ACIAR Act) was passed. Sir John Crawford was appointed as the first chairman of its Board of Management, with Professor Jim McWilliam appointed as the first Director.

The first projects supported by ACIAR commenced in 1983.

Research outcomes 
ACIAR contributes to sustainable economic growth and enhanced regional stability within the Indo-Pacific, with a particular focus on economic diplomacy and women’s economic empowerment.

Examples of ACIAR research that has been applied to improve the livelihoods of farmers both in partner countries and in Australia:

 Panama disease TR4 
 Fall armyworm
 Honey bee pests and diseases
 Restoration of coral reefs
 Oysters

ACIAR has made a significant contribution to meeting the complex challenges of growing more food, reducing poverty and improving biosecurity in the Indo-Pacific region. Over this time ACIAR has committed to assessing impact and where possible, quantifying the achievements of Australian and international research partners. A 2022 impact assessment of the research funded by ACIAR since its inception outlined the total benefit of projects is estimated at $64.4 billion with a benefit: cost ratio of 43:1.

ACIAR produces a range of publications to capture and share the results and insights into research activities.

ACIAR fellowships, scholarships, and training support 
The John Allwright and John Dillion Memorial fellowships provides the opportunity for partner country scientists involved in ACIAR-supported research projects to obtain postgraduate qualifications at Australian tertiary institutions. The fellowships are administered through the Australia Awards.

The Meryl Williams fellowship is s leadership program that aims to strengthen the leadership and management skills of women working in agricultural research for development in the Indo-Pacific and is administered through the University of New England.

The Pacific Agriculture Scholarships and Support (PASS) Program provides scholarships and support to postgraduate students in agriculture, forestry and fisheries at The University of the South Pacific and Fiji National University.

ACIAR also supports training activities delivered by the Crawford Fund including the Master Class and Training Program, a program of online mentoring linking agricultural researchers from developing countries with mentors in Australia, and the next-gen suite of activities designed to build interest in careers in international agricultural research.

References

External links
 Official ACIAR website
 Department of Foreign Affairs and Trade website
 Australia Awards website

Commonwealth Government agencies of Australia
Funding bodies of Australia
Agricultural research